Leslie Graves is the founder and president of Ballotpedia, a nonprofit online political encyclopedia.

Education
Graves has a bachelor's degree in liberal arts from St. John's College, Annapolis, Maryland. She did graduate work in philosophy at the University of Wisconsin–Madison.

She co-authored "Is indeterminism the source of the statistical character of evolutionary theory?" in the Philosophy of Science and wrote "Transgressive traditions and art definitions" for the Journal of Aesthetics and Art Criticism.

Early career
In 1980, Graves collected signatures to qualify the Libertarian Party's presidential candidate, Ed Clark, for a spot on the ballot. She later served as Wisconsin chair of the Libertarian Party, and as the party's national finance chair.

Ballotpedia
In December 2006, Graves founded the Lucy Burns Institute, a nonpartisan nonprofit organization that publishes Ballotpedia. In 2012, Graves authored a guidebook titled Local Ballot Initiatives: How citizens change laws with clipboards, conversations, and campaigns.

Graves' political analysis has been included in the Wall Street Journal, Reuters, Bloomberg News, Campaigns and Elections, and the Milwaukee Journal Sentinel.

Judgepedia was originally launched in 2007 by the Chicago-based nonprofit of her spouse, Sam Adams Alliance. Graves was "busy at that time with WikIFOIA," she did not think she could take on a project the size of Judgepedia. Graves stayed involved in the project as a volunteer and then a consultant. In March 2009, when the founding editor of the Judgepedia project left the Sam Adams Alliance, a staff member from Graves' group stepped in as editor, which led to the decision to cede sponsorship to the Lucy Burns Institute in July.

Personal life
Graves is married to political activist Eric O'Keefe.

Olympic rower Carie Graves is one of her three sisters. In 1998, all four Graves sisters competed in team rowing at the Nike World Games under the name "Team Four Sisters."

References

Living people
 University of Wisconsin–Madison College of Letters and Science alumni
St. John's College (Annapolis/Santa Fe) alumni
Wisconsin Libertarians
Date of birth missing (living people)
Place of birth missing (living people)
1950s births